SC São João de Ver  is a professional association football club based in the parish of São João de Ver, municipality of Santa Maria da Feira, District of Aveiro Portugal. The team competes in Liga 3, the third tier of the Portuguese football league system. The club was founded in on June 25, 1929.

The men's football team plays in the Liga 3.

History 
The club was founded in 1929 in the city of São João de Ver in the council of Santa Maria da Feira of the Aveiro district and much of its history has been spent in the regional leagues of Aveiro until in the 2000/01 season it manages to ascend to the leagues.

After they won the promotion to the now defunct Second Division of Portugal, in which they spent just two seasons.

They have participated in the Portuguese Cup on some occasions without much success to date.

Stadium 
SC SJV play their home games at the São João de Ver Sporting Club Stadium.

Current squad

Out on loan

Honours and achievements

Leagues 

 Liga Regional de Aveiro: 1

 2019/20

 Primera División de Aveiro: 2

 1963/64, 1973/74

Cups

 Copa de Aveiro: 1

 2018/19

References

Football clubs in Portugal
Association football clubs established in 1929
1929 establishments in Portugal